Tamás Sós (born 5 April 1954) is a Hungarian politician, member of the National Assembly (MP) for Pétervására from 2002 to 2010 (Heves County Constituency II). He was also a Member of Parliament from the Heves County regional list of the Hungarian Socialist Party (MSZP) from 2010 to 2014.

During the campaign period of the 2014 parliamentary election, Sós was the subject of controversy due to allegations of plagiarism in his pedagogy PhD thesis. The Eötvös Loránd University (ELTE) withdrew his doctoral title in April 2014.

References

1954 births
Living people
Members of the Hungarian Socialist Workers' Party
Hungarian Socialist Party politicians
Members of the National Assembly of Hungary (2002–2006)
Members of the National Assembly of Hungary (2006–2010)
Members of the National Assembly of Hungary (2010–2014)
People from Eger